ExCo may refer to:
 Executive Committee (disambiguation)
 Executive Council (disambiguation)
 Experimental College (disambiguation)
 Exco Levi, Canadian musician
 Exco International, a British money brokerage
 Exco Technologies, a Canadian tool and die supplier
 Excavation Contractor or Company, ExCo, Ex/Co, Ex. Co.